Terror in the Aisles is a 1984 American documentary film about horror films, including slasher films and crime thrillers. The film is directed by Andrew J. Kuehn, and hosted by Donald Pleasence and Nancy Allen. The original music score is composed by John Beal.

Plot 
Director Andrew J. Kuehn has excerpted brief segments of terror and suspense in a wide variety of horror movies and strung them together with added commentary, as well as some enacted narrative, to create a compilation of fright-inducing effects. Halloween actor Donald Pleasence and Dressed to Kill star Nancy Allen provide the commentary on topics such as "sex and terror" (Dressed to Kill, Klute, Ms .45, The Seduction, When a Stranger Calls), loathsome villains (Dracula, Frankenstein, Friday the 13th Part 2, Halloween I & II, Marathon Man, Nighthawks, The Texas Chain Saw Massacre, Vice Squad, Wait Until Dark, What Ever Happened to Baby Jane?), "natural terror" (Alligator, The Birds, The Fly, The Food of the Gods, Frogs, Jaws 1 & 2, Konga, Nightwing), the occult (An American Werewolf in London, Rosemary's Baby, The Exorcist, The Omen, Carrie, The Fog, The Fury, The Howling, Poltergeist, The Shining) and spoofs (Abbott and Costello Meet Frankenstein, Hold That Ghost, The Ghost Breakers, Scared Stiff, Phantom of the Paradise, Saturday the 14th). In one segment of the anthology, legendary filmmaker Alfred Hitchcock presents his concepts of how to create suspense in a clip from Alfred Hitchcock: Men Who Made The Movies.

Release 
The movie was released wide theatrically in the United States by Universal Pictures on October 26, 1984. The movie grossed $10,004,817 at the box office.

Reception 
Gene Siskel of the Chicago Tribune gave the movie zero stars out of four, explaining, "Scary movie scenes work best when they're set up by some expository foreplay, which is why this compilation of horrors doesn't really work." Vincent Canby of The New York Times thought the commentary from the hosts was "pretty dumb" and concluded, "Because 'Terror in the Aisles' is composed entirely of climaxes, it has none of its own." Variety called the movie "poorly conceived and executed", adding, "Applying the rapid editing and juxtaposition techniques to a feature-length project results in simply ruining many classic movie sequences rather than preserving them." Kevin Thomas of the Los Angeles Times thought the movie was "often fun" but criticized the "cornball, patently phony audience reaction shots." Richard Combs of The Monthly Film Bulletin called it "The That's Entertainment of horror movies—in other words, its dexterity at pasting together clips from a selection of scaries, old and new, is not matched by a glimmer of the historical awareness, or even filmic appreciation, that would make the exercise worthwhile."

Home media 
The movie was released on VHS and CED Videodiscs by MCA Home Video in 1985. On September 13, 2011, the movie was released to digital format as a special feature on the 30th Anniversary Edition Blu-ray of Halloween II (1981). On October 15, 2012, Universal Pictures Home Entertainment released the movie on DVD as part of its Universal Vault Series.

The movie's DVD and Blu-ray release is presented in the same 1.85:1 aspect ratio of its original theatrical release, which also cropped any segments from other movies that were originally produced using the anamorphic process. The number of terror, suspense, horror and thriller movie clips that are featured and shown from in this documentary totaled to seventy-eight clips.

On October 13, 2020, the movie received its own Blu-ray release courtesy of Scream Factory. As with the previous releases, it was presented in its original aspect ratio; unlike the earlier releases, the Blu-ray includes all-new bonus features, including a new interview with Nancy Allen and the alternate broadcast television edit of the movie.

Archival appearances 

 Bud Abbott
 Brooke Adams
 Julia Adams
 Ana Alicia
 Alan Arkin
 Susan Backlinie
 Belinda Balaski
 Martin Balsam
 Adrienne Barbeau
 Ralph Bellamy
 Elizabeth Berridge
 Sidney Blackmer
 Nina Blackwood
 Linda Blair
 Wilford Brimley
 Richard Brooker
 Marilyn Burns
 Ellen Burstyn
 Michael Caine
 Veronica Cartwright
 John Cassavetes
 Lon Chaney Jr.
 Lou Costello
 Charles Cioffi
 Joan Crawford
 Richard Crenna
 Jamie Lee Curtis
 Keith David
 Bette Davis
 Brad Davis
 Joan Davis
 Angie Dickinson
 Faye Dunaway
 Griffin Dunne
 Shelley Duvall
 Clint Eastwood
 Morgan Fairchild
 Mia Farrow
 William Finley
 Jane Fonda
 John Gavin
 Jeff Goldblum
 Elliott Gould
 Gerrit Graham
 Cary Grant
 Rosey Grier
 Charles Hallahan
 Gunnar Hansen
 Jessica Harper
 Debbie Harry
 Rutger Hauer
 Wings Hauser
 David Hedison
 Tippi Hedren
 Dustin Hoffman
 Ian Holm
 Season Hubley
 Michael Ironside
 Amy Irving
 Carol Kane
 Boris Karloff
 Grace Kelly
 Persis Khambatta
 Margot Kidder
 Dana Kimmell
 Adrienne King
 Yaphet Kotto
 Elsa Lanchester
 Stephen Lack
 Martin Landau
 Frank Langella
 Piper Laurie
 Janet Leigh
 Jerry Lewis
 Danny Lloyd
 Lynn Lowry
 Bela Lugosi
 Zoe Tamerlis Lund
 Herbert Marshall
 Dean Martin
 Kevin McCarthy
 Leo McKern
 Teri McMinn
 Vera Miles
 Jason Miller
 Tawny Moyer
 David Naughton
 Kate Nelligan
 Jack Nicholson
 Laurence Olivier
 Heather O'Rourke
 Patricia Owens
 Betsy Palmer
 Gregory Peck
 Anthony Perkins
 Christopher Plummer
 Vincent Price
 Lee Remick
 Kurt Russell
 Roy Scheider
 P. J. Soles
 Sissy Spacek
 Sylvester Stallone
 Harry Dean Stanton
 Amy Steel
 Andrew Stevens
 Catherine Mary Stewart
 Donald Sutherland
 Gary Swanson
 Max von Sydow
 Jessica Tandy
 Rod Taylor
 Robert Walker
 Dee Wallace
 Jessica Walter
 Sigourney Weaver
 Jack Weston
 Billie Whitelaw
 Billy Dee Williams
 James Woods

Films shown 

 Bride of Frankenstein (1935)
 The Ghost Breakers (1940)
 Hold That Ghost (1941)
 The Wolf Man (1941)
 Abbott and Costello Meet Frankenstein (1948)
 Strangers on a Train (1951)
 Scared Stiff (1953)
 Creature from the Black Lagoon (1954)
 This Island Earth (1955)
 To Catch a Thief (1955)
 Tarantula! (1955)
 The Incredible Shrinking Man (1957)
 The Deadly Mantis (1957)
 The Fly (1958)
 Psycho (1960)
 Konga (1961)
 King Kong vs. Godzilla (1962)
 What Ever Happened to Baby Jane? (1962)
 The Birds (1963)
 Wait Until Dark (1967)
 Rosemary's Baby (1968)
 Night of the Living Dead (1968)
 Klute (1971)
 Play Misty for Me (1971)
 Frogs (1972)
 Frenzy (1972)
 Sisters (1972)
 The Thing with Two Heads (1972)
 The Exorcist (1973)
 The Texas Chain Saw Massacre (1974)
 Phantom of the Paradise (1974)
 Bug (1975)
 Jaws (1975)
 Grizzly (1976)
 The Food of the Gods (1976)
 The Omen (1976)
 Marathon Man (1976)
 Carrie (1976)
 Suspiria (1977)
 The Car (1977)
 The Fury (1978)
 Jaws 2 (1978)
 Eyes of Laura Mars (1978)
 Midnight Express (1978)
 Dawn of the Dead (1978, Italy)
 The Silent Partner (1978)
 Piranha (1978)
 Halloween (1978)
 The Legacy (1978)
 Invasion of the Body Snatchers (1978)
 Alien (1979)
 The Brood (1979)
 Prophecy (1979)
 Dracula (1979)
 Nightwing (1979)
 When a Stranger Calls (1979)
 Friday the 13th (1980)
 The Fog (1980)
 The Shining (1980)
 Dressed to Kill (1980)
 Alligator (1980)
 Scanners (1981)
 The Howling (1981)
 The Funhouse (1981)
 Ms .45 (1981)
 Friday the 13th Part 2 (1981)
 The Postman Always Rings Twice (1981)
 An American Werewolf in London (1981)
 Halloween II (1981)
 Nighthawks (1981)
 Saturday the 14th (1981)
 The Seduction (1982)
 Friday the 13th Part III (1982)
 Halloween III: Season of the Witch (1982)
 Creepshow (1982)
 Vice Squad (1982)
 Cat People (1982)
 Poltergeist (1982)
 The Thing (1982)
 Alone in the Dark (1982)
 Videodrome (1983)
 Firestarter (1984)

References

External links 
 
 
 
 

1984 films
1984 documentary films
1984 horror films
1980s American films
1980s English-language films
American documentary films
Documentary films about films
Documentary films about horror
Films directed by Andrew J. Kuehn
Universal Pictures films